Yengi Kand or Yangi Kand or Yengikand or Yangikend, also rendered as Yengeh Kand, may refer to:
 Yengi Kand, Hashtrud, East Azerbaijan Province
 Yengi Kand, Meyaneh, East Azerbaijan Province
 Yengi Kand, Garmeh-ye Jonubi, Meyaneh County, East Azerbaijan Province
 Yengi Kand, Tabriz, East Azerbaijan Province
 Yengikand-e Khaneh-ye Barq, East Azerbaijan Province
 Yengikand-e Khusheh Mehr, East Azerbaijan Province
 Yengi Kand, Hamadan
 Yengi Kand, Bijar, Kurdistan Province
 Yengikand, Chang Almas, Bijar County, Kurdistan Province
 Yengi Kand, Divandarreh, Kurdistan Province
 Yangi Kand, Qazvin
 Yengi Kand, Bukan, West Azerbaijan Province
 Yengi Kand, Miandoab, West Azerbaijan Province
 Yengi Kand, Takab, West Azerbaijan Province
 Yengi Kand, Zanjan
 Yengi Kand-e Almasi, Zanjan Province
 Yengi Kand-e Jame ol Sara, Zanjan Province
 Yengi Kand-e Kandesaha, Zanjan Province
 Yengi Kand-e Seyyedlar, Zanjan Province